A virtual network operator (VNO) or mobile virtual network operator (MVNO) is a provider of management services and a reseller of network services from other telecommunications suppliers that does not own the telecommunication infrastructure. These network providers are categorized as virtual because they provide network services to customers without owning the underlying network. A VNO typically leases bandwidth at the wholesale rates from various telecom providers in order to provide solutions to their customers. The VNO concept is relatively new in the North American market when compared to the European and Asian markets. India's Department of Telecommunications opened up licensing to VNOs in 2016 and awarded the first VNO Unified License in May 2017.
Fully virtual VNOs do not have any technical facilities or technical support provision, instead they rely upon the support delivered by the owners of the underlying infrastructure. The VNO concept has gained a lot of traction in the telecommunications industry as the cost of infrastructure is substantial.

As the global networks have become more complex, an emerging field of telecommunications "Logistics" providers has developed. These companies assist in the management of large networks which span across multiple carriers much in the same way that the Virtual Network Operators had, but this new breed of services providers have been willing to build their own networks and own infrastructure.

See also
Vanco
Mobile virtual network operator

References

Mobile virtual network operators